Ladies Love Brutes is a 1930 American pre-Code comedy film starring George Bancroft, Mary Astor, and Fredric March. The film was directed by Rowland V. Lee and based on the play Pardon My Glove by Zoë Akins.

Cast
George Bancroft as Joe Forziati, a New York building contractor
Mary Astor as Mimi Howell, a socialite
Fredric March as Dwight Howell, Mimi's ex-husband
Margaret Quimby as Lucille
Stanley Fields as Mike Mendino, a gangster
Lawford Davidson as George Winham, Joe Forziati's lawyer
Paul Fix as Slip, a member of Mike's gang
Freddie Burke Frederick as Jackie Howell, kid

Sources

External links
 

 
"Ladies Love Brutes" at Turner Classic Movies

1930 films
Films directed by Rowland V. Lee
1930s English-language films
Films with screenplays by Herman J. Mankiewicz
American films based on plays
1930 comedy films
American comedy films
American black-and-white films
Paramount Pictures films
1930s American films